The 2010 Seguros Bolívar Open Cali was a professional tennis tournament played on outdoor red clay courts. It was the third edition of the tournament which was part of the 2010 ATP Challenger Tour. It took place in Cali, Colombia between 27 September and 3 October 2010.

ATP entrants

Seeds

 Rankings are as of September 20, 2010.

Other entrants
The following players received wildcards into the singles main draw:
  Juan Sebastián Gómez
  Roggan Gracie
  Giovanni Lapentti
  Eduardo Struvay

The following players received entry from the qualifying draw:
  Júlio César Campozano
  Leonardo Kirche
  José Pereira
  Daniel Yoo

Champions

Singles

 Carlos Salamanca def.  Júlio Silva, 7–5, 3–6, 6–3

Doubles

 Andre Begemann /  Martin Emmrich def.  Gero Kretschmer /  Alex Satschko, 6–4, 7–6(5)

External links
Official site of Seguros Bolívar Tennis
ITF Search 

Seguros Bolivar Open Cali
2010 in Colombian tennis
Tennis tournaments in Colombia
Seguros Bolívar Open Cali